Felix Brych (born 3 August 1975) is a German football referee. He referees for SV Am Hart München of the Bavarian Football Association. He is a former FIFA referee and was ranked as a UEFA elite category referee.

Refereeing career
Brych started refereeing in the Bundesliga in 2004 and was awarded his FIFA badge in 2007. He refereed his first senior international match in October that year, taking charge of Romania's 2–0 win over Luxembourg in UEFA Euro 2008 qualifying Group G. In February 2008, Brych was appointed to referee the 2007–08 UEFA Cup Round of 32 match between Panathinaikos and Rangers, and in October 2008, he officiated the 2008–09 UEFA Champions League Group D match between Liverpool and PSV Eindhoven.

Brych officiated the first leg of the 2011–12 Champions League semi-final between Chelsea and Barcelona, a match that finished with a win for the Blues over the defending champions. In August 2013 he officiated an international friendly between England and Scotland at Wembley Stadium.

On 14 May 2014, Brych refereed the 2014 UEFA Europa League Final between Sevilla and Benfica. The match finished 0–0 after extra time, and went to a penalty shoot-out, which Sevilla won 4–2, in what was considered a controversial officiating.

On 12 May 2017, Brych was chosen by UEFA as the referee for the 2017 UEFA Champions League Final, played in Cardiff on 3 June 2017 between Juventus and Real Madrid. He was joined by assistants Mark Borsch and Stefan Lupp, and the fourth official was Serbian Milorad Mažić. Bastian Dankert and Marco Fritz served as the additional assistant referees, with Rafael Foltyn appointed as the reserve assistant referee.

On 29 March 2018, Brych was selected by FIFA as one of the referees to officiate at the 2018 FIFA World Cup in Russia, his second FIFA World Cup. Brych was joined by assistants Mark Borsch and Stefan Lupp. He refereed just one game at the tournament, Switzerland's 2–1 win over Serbia. However, after controversially not awarding Serbia a penalty, FIFA made the decision that Brych would officiate no further matches at the tournament. The politically explosive match was followed by heavy criticism from the Serbian media and representatives of Serbian football. In this regard, Mladen Krstajić, the coach of the Serbian national team, said one day after the lost game with a view to the war crimes of the Yugoslav Wars: "I would send him to the Hague. Then they could put him on trial, like he did to us." For this Krstajić was punished with a fine of 5,000 Swiss francs.

At UEFA Euro 2020 he was rehabilitated and refereed one game of the Round of 16, Belgium's 1-0 win over Portugal, one quarter-final (England's 4-0 win over Ukraine) and finally the semi-final game of Italy against Spain at Wembley Stadium, London on 6 July 2021.

Personal life
Outside football Brych is a qualified doctor of law, having written his doctorate about sport.

Record

Major national team competition

Other matches

UEFA club competition

Honours
 Globe Soccer Awards – Best Referee of the Year: 2017
 IFFHS World's Best Man Referee: 2017, 2021
 IFFHS World's Best Man Referee of the Decade 2011–2020
 IFFHS World's Best Man Referee of the 21st Century 2001–2020

References

External links
 Profile at dfb.de 
 Profile at worldfootball.net

 Felix Brych

1975 births
Living people
German football referees
Sportspeople from Munich
UEFA Champions League referees
UEFA Europa League referees
Olympic football referees
Football referees at the 2012 Summer Olympics
2014 FIFA World Cup referees
UEFA Euro 2016 referees
2018 FIFA World Cup referees
UEFA Euro 2020 referees